Need for Speed: No Limits (stylized as NFS No Limits from 2021 onward) is a free-to-play racing game for iOS and Android, and a mobile installment in the Need for Speed video game series, developed by Firemonkeys Studios and published by Electronic Arts. It is the twenty-first installment in the franchise, the franchise's second free-to-play title (after Need for Speed: World), as well as the franchise's first original title made for mobile devices, unlike past mobile games in the series that were adaptations or companions of various Need for Speed games. It was released on September 30, 2015.

Gameplay
Need for Speed: No Limits has a heavy focus on street racing, vehicle customization, and avoiding the police.

The player must race in "Campaign races" (which is considered the game's story mode), "Car Series races" (where only certain cars may participate to win in-game rewards) and "Rival Races", which are ghost-based multiplayer races. As well, the player can participate in time-limited special events, where the player will be loaned a special car for use in the event. If the player is able to complete the event before its time runs out, the loaned car will be permanently added to the player's garage as a completion reward. 

Most cars in the game can be customized with wheels, body-kits, widebody kits, paint jobs, and wraps, in addition to performance upgrade. Unique cars acquired from time-limited special events (as well as Ferrari cars), however, can never be visually customized.

Reception

Need for Speed: No Limits received mixed reviews. Critics praised the game's visuals, controls and gameplay, but criticized its aggressive free-to-play system and short races. Review aggregator website Metacritic gave the game 67/100 based on 8 reviews.

Harry Slater of Pocket Gamer gave the game a score of 8 out of 10, praising the game's visuals, fast gameplay and free access, but criticizing the game's short races. Keith Andrew of Trusted Reviews gave the game 3/5, criticising the need to pay a considerable amount of microtransactions if players want to access all cars.

References

External links
 
 

2015 video games
Android (operating system) games
IOS games
 No Limits
Street racing video games
Video games developed in Australia
Video games set in the United States